Abraham Rubin Hercules Benrubi (born October 4, 1969) is an American actor. He is known for his appearances as Jerry Markovic on the long-running medical television drama ER, for his first role as Larry Kubiac on the series Parker Lewis Can't Lose, Dennis in Without a Paddle, and for his voice acting on the Adult Swim claymation series Robot Chicken as well as numerous video games including many in the World of Warcraft series.

Early life and education
Benrubi was born on October 4, 1969, in Indianapolis, Indiana, the eldest son of Patricia and Asher Benrubi, who was a rock singer and is currently a radio personality known as "Smash" to St. Louis radio audiences. His paternal grandfather was from a Greek-Jewish family. His paternal grandmother, who was born to a Greek Orthodox Christian family, helped shelter Jews in Greece during World War II and later converted to Judaism.

Benrubi graduated from Broad Ripple High School in Indianapolis, the same high school alma mater of David Letterman, Indiana Hoosiers men's basketball head coach Mike Woodson and former New England Patriots star Rosevelt Colvin.

Career
Benrubi's first major role was on the show Wings, as Roy "R.J." Biggins, Jr., Roy's gay son. He would appear as R.J. twice: once during the show's first season, and again during the seventh season, shortly after he began working on NBC's ER.

Between the first and second seasons of Parker Lewis Can't Lose, Benrubi and co-star Taj Johnson worked as roadies for No Doubt's first tour.

Benrubi starred as one of the main characters in ABC's show Men in Trees, playing bartender/millionaire Ben Tomasson. This was a role where he got noticeably more main dialog and depth than with his previous longtime characters on ER and Parker Lewis Can't Lose, which primarily consisted of supporting dialog. Ben Tomasson was described as "the cuddliest TV character since Jorge Garcia's Hurley on Lost" by TV-critic David Bianculli. Other previous work includes portraying Mose in the 2003 western Open Range, a role the actor won because he had been cut out of director Kevin Costner's previous film, The Postman. He frequently voices characters on Adult Swim's stop-motion animation show Robot Chicken (created by personal friend Seth Green), and has also contributed to a second show from Chicken's creators, Titan Maximum.

Following the cancellation of Men In Trees in early 2007, Benrubi returned to the cast of ER in late 2008 for the show's final season.

Benrubi portrayed a young Dan Conner, the character portrayed by John Goodman, in a flashback episode of Roseanne.

Benrubi starred in the short lived (April 2010 to June 2010) ABC show, Happy Town where he portrayed the part of Big Dave Duncan. Almost immediately after ABC announced the series' cancellation, he appeared in a new show Memphis Beat, where he portrayed the part of police Sgt. Jody "JC" Lightfoot, a desk sergeant that is 1/16 Chickasaw by a distant relative, but chooses to embrace Native American culture all the same.

In May 2011, it was announced that he would star in Glutton, a "3D psychological thriller" directed by David Arquette. Benrubi will play Jethro, a 1,200-pound man, forced to save his sister's life. Jethro's sister is portrayed by Patricia Arquette, while Kacey Barnfield also stars as his blind neighbor and only friend.

Benrubi is a member of Los Angeles' Sacred Fools Theater Company.

Filmography

Film

Television

Video games

References

External links
 
 

1969 births
Living people
20th-century American male actors
21st-century American male actors
American male film actors
American male television actors
American male voice actors
American people of Greek descent
American people of Greek-Jewish descent
Jewish American male actors
Male actors from Indianapolis
21st-century American Jews